The Capricieuse was a late 22-gun corvette of the French Navy.

Career 
Capricieuse was commissioned under Arnault de Gorse on 1 September 1849. From 1850, she served in the Far East under Captain Rocquemaurel, returning to Toulon in 1854. She then took part in the Crimean War as a troopship.

Capricieuse returned to China in 1856. In 1858, she took part in the Battle of Canton, being present at the capture of the city on 30 January and at the Battle of Taku Forts.

She returned to Toulon in 1860. Struck in 1865, she was broken up in 1868.

Notes, citations and references

Notes

Citations

References

Age of Sail corvettes of France
Ships built in France
1849 ships